Liam Paul Paris Howlett (born 21 August 1971) is an English record producer, musician, songwriter, instrumentalist, co-founder and leader of the British electronic band the Prodigy, and an occasional DJ.

Early years
Howlett was born in Braintree, Essex, England.

He was trained in classical piano (from childhood). At the age of 14, he mixed songs recorded from the radio using the pause button on his cassette player. He was first influenced by hip hop music and culture when he began to attend school at Alec Hunter High School in Braintree. He learned breakdancing alongside his crew called the Pure City Breakers, and DJed in his first band Cut 2 Kill. After a fight at a gig in support of the band, Liam left Cut 2 Kill and started to write his own music.

He went to his first rave in 1989.

Music career

The Prodigy

Howlett and dancer/vocalist Keith Flint formed the Prodigy in 1990.

Other musical projects
In 1998, Howlett was offered the chance to do a mix for Mary Anne Hobbs' radio show. He dug out some of his old favourite tracks again and this prompted him to release an edited (due to some copyright issues) version of the mix in February 1999. It was the first material which was recorded in his new home studio "The Dirtchamber", so accordingly the album was to be called Prodigy present The Dirtchamber Sessions Volume One.

In 1990, Howlett composed music for the film The Uranus Experiment. Described as an "anal space opera", the film featured the first sex scene shot in microgravity.

In the end of January 2006, a compilation album titled Back to Mine: Liam Prodigy was released. It was a collection of Howlett's favourite tunes, including an exclusive Prodigy track called "Wake the Fuck Up", which was often performed as an intro in the Prodigy's live concerts.

Howlett was a co-producer on the track "Immunize" from Australian drum and bass act Pendulum's third album Immersion, which was released in 2010.

In 2012, Howlett co-produced the first single "We Hate Everyone" from K.Flay's EP Eyes Shut. He also produced the song ‘Stop, Focus’ from the same EP.

On March 30 2022, it was announced that Howlett would compose the musical score for the Netflix's movie Choose or Die

Personal life
Howlett has been married to Natalie Appleton of All Saints since 2002. They have a son, born 2 March 2004, and live in Hampstead, London.

References

External links
 Interview at SuicideGirls.com on 25 March 2006

1971 births
Living people
English keyboardists
English record producers
English electronic musicians
English techno musicians
Hardcore techno musicians
Big beat musicians
Remixers
Club DJs
The Prodigy members
Ableton Live users
People from Braintree, Essex
Musicians from Essex
Breakbeat hardcore musicians